Oliver Springs High School (OSHS) is the Roane County high school operated by Roane County Schools that serves the city of Oliver Springs, Tennessee. Some of the park's facilities are used for school extracurricular programs. The school is STEAM certified. The school has 44 faculty for a student-teacher ratio at Oliver Springs High School of 21:1. Justin Nivens is the Principal. Dr. Nipper is the Assistant Principal.

References

External links 
 

Public high schools in Tennessee
Schools in Roane County, Tennessee